David Heska Wanbli Weiden [deɪvɪd hɛskɛn wɒnbliː waɪdɛn] is a Lakota American author of crime and thriller novels and a professor of Native American studies at Metropolitan State University of Denver. His debut novel, Winter Counts, won an Anthony Award, Lefty Award, ITW Thriller Award, Barry Award, and Macavity Award.

Biography 
Weiden grew up in the Swansea/Elyria neighborhood of Denver, Colorado. As an  enrolled member of the Sicangu Lakota Nation, he spent summers at the Rosebud Indian Reservation in South Dakota.

A first-generation college student, Weiden received a Bachelor of Arts from the University of Colorado Boulder and a Juris Doctor degree from University of Denver's Sturm College of Law. After practicing law for several years, he decided to pursue a job in academia, so he earned a Doctor of Philosophy degree in political science from the University of Texas at Austin. After receiving his doctorate, he taught at Hofstra University, Illinois State University, and the Naval Academy Preparatory School. Following the birth of his children, he decided he wanted to devote time and energy to writing creatively, so in 2011, he began a Master of Fine Arts (MFA) degree at Vermont College of Fine Arts, later transferring to the Institute of American Indian Arts. He is currently a tenured professor of Native American studies and Political Science at Metropolitan State University of Denver. His academic and legal work focuses on Native American issues, and he provides legal assistance to various Native American organizations. He also works with MFA programs at Cedar Crest College and Regis University. In 2022, he served as a mentor for PEN America's Emerging Writers program.

Weiden presently lives in Denver with his family.

Awards and honors 
Weiden has received a MacDowell Fellowship (2018, 2022) and the PEN America Writing for Justice Fellowship (2018), He has also been a Ragdale Foundation Resident in Fiction and  a Tin House Scholar (2019).

His debut novel, Winter Counts was named one of the best crime novels of the year by The Guardian, NPR, and Publishers Weekly. It was also a New York Times Editors' Choice selection in October 2020.

Publications

Books 

 Spotted Tail, illustrated by Jim Yellowhawk (2019)
 Winter Counts (2020)
 Wisdom Corner (2023)

Short works

Creative nonfiction 

 “Carlisle Longings,” published in Shenandoah (Fall 2019)
 “Writing in the Time of Family Separations,” published in Shenandoah (2020)
 “Afterword: Keeping Faith on the Reservation,” published in Indian Land, by Zen Lefort (2022)

Nonfiction, essays, and blog posts 

 “This 19th-Century Law Helps Shape Criminal Justice in Indian Country,” published in The New York Times (July 19, 2020). Reprinted in The Salt Lake Tribune (July 20, 2020)
 “Distractions,” published on the Poisoned Pen blog (August 19, 2020)
 “Seven Essential Native American Crime Novels,” published in The Strand Magazine (September 5, 2020)
 “Why Indigenous Crime Fiction Matters,” published in CrimeReads (September 9, 2020)
 “A Year in Reading,” published in The Millions (December 9, 2020)
 “Bury My Heart at Wounded Knee: Evaluating the Book’s Significance, 50 Years After its Publication,” published in Roundup Magazine (February 2021)
 “Writing to Change the World: Strategies for Social Justice in Fiction,” published in Writer’s Digest (July/August 2021)
 “Writing Winter Counts,” published in The Bookseller (August 13, 2021)
 “Looking Back on ‘There There,'” published on Alta Online (November 2021)
 “Manifest Destiny,” published in The Routledge Companion to Race and Ethnicity (2021)
 “The First Two Pages of ‘Skin,'” published in Art Taylor, The First Two Pages (January 18, 2022)
 “Violence And Love and Family Ties,” published in the Los Angeles Review (June, 2022)

Short stories 

 “Apollo,” published in Foundling Review (2010)
 “Saltines,” published in Criminal Class Review (2012)
 “Sourtoe,” published in Tribal College Journal (2014)
 “Winter Counts,” published in Yellow Medicine Review (2014)
 “Spork,” published in Transmotion (2016)
 “Skin,” published in Midnight Hour, edited by Abby Vandiver (2021)
 “Turning Heart,” published in This Time For Sure, edited by Hank Phillippi Ryan (2021). Reprinted in the Best American Mystery and Suspense 2022 collection, edited by Jess Walter and Steph Cha
 “Colfax and Havana,” published in Denver Noir, edited by Cynthia Swanson (2022)
 “Hooch,” published in The Perfect Crime, edited by Maxim Jakubowski and Vaseem Khan (2022)
 “Sundays,” published in Never Whistle at Night, edited by Shane Hawk and Theodore Van Alst (2023)

References

External links 

 Official website

Writers from Denver
Brulé people
University of Colorado Boulder alumni
University of Texas at Austin alumni
Sturm College of Law alumni
University of Denver alumni
Institute of American Indian Arts alumni
Metropolitan State University of Denver
Year of birth missing (living people)
Living people